Ko Chih-en (born 29 April 1962) is a Taiwanese educator and politician.

Early life and career
Ko's father  served as magistrate of Pingtung County between 1973 and 1981. Ko Chih-en was born in 1962, and attended National Chengchi University, earning a bachelor's degree in education. She then obtained a master of education degree from Michigan State University and a doctorate in educational psychology at University of Southern California, both in the United States. Subsequently, Ko joined the faculty of Tamkang University. In 2008, she was named dean of student affairs at Tamkang.

Political career
In November 2015, Ko was placed second on the Kuomintang party list, immediately following longtime legislator Wang Jin-pyng, regarded as part of the safe list, ensuring electoral victory. She arrived at the Legislative Yuan to take office on 1 February 2016, with a group of Tamkang students. Shortly after Ko was seated, the Kuomintang asked her to open an office in Pingtung County. She served as convener of the legislative education committee between February 2017 and March 2018, later leading the KMT's women's department. In May 2017, Ko joined the Renewable Power Promotion Alliance founded by Mary Chen.

As a legislator, Ko took an interest in education, LGBT rights, women's rights, pension reform, and energy. She was supportive of many cultural exchanges between Taiwan and other countries, namely China. Soon after taking office, she co-signed a bill proposed by Karen Yu to allow young children into the legislative chamber. In March 2018, Ko remarked that customs deemed discriminatory toward women should be phased out. She approached pension reform from a schoolteacher's perspective, proposing that the monthly pension be capped at NT$32,160, and suggested that pensions be withheld from retired public servants that took positions at government funded agencies willing to pay half of their former salary.

Ko drew attention to corruption on private school boards, the labor rights of graduate students, funding for internships, and policies affecting foreign students. She took an interest in student safety, and to this end, helped pass stricter restrictions on cram school instructors. In November 2017, Ko advised James C. Liao and others affiliated with Academia Sinica to resign from National Taiwan University's presidential selection committee to avoid a conflict of interest, as two candidates under consideration were Academia Sinica's then- and former vice president. When Kuan Chung-ming was named NTU president, Ko pushed the Ministry of Education to confirm his election, though Kuan was also suspected of a conflict of interest.

Upon completing her term in the Legislative Yuan, Ko returned to her professorship within Tamkang University's Graduate Institute of Educational Psychology and Counseling and concurrently headed the National Policy Foundation, a Kuomintang think tank. She was nominated as the KMT candidate for the Kaohsiung mayoralty in June 2022.

References

1962 births
Living people
Academic staff of Tamkang University
University of Southern California alumni
Michigan State University alumni
National Chengchi University alumni
21st-century Taiwanese women politicians
Members of the 9th Legislative Yuan
Kuomintang Members of the Legislative Yuan in Taiwan
Party List Members of the Legislative Yuan